The Network Abuse Clearinghouse, better known as abuse.net, maintains a contact database for reporting network abuse. It makes entries from the database available (via Web, DNS, and WHOIS), and provides an intermediary service for registered users to forward complaints by e-mail.

In 1997, abuse.net started as an experimental service for users to send complaints to domain.name@abuse.net for clearing.

See also
 Anti-spam techniques (e-mail)
 Hacker (computer security)
 news.admin.net-abuse.email
 Phishing
 Spamming
 Cyberbullying

References

External links